Cappamore is a small town in northeast County Limerick in the midwest of Ireland. It is also a parish in the Roman Catholic Archdiocese of Cashel and Emly.

Location and facilities

Cappamore is situated on the R505 regional road, on the banks of the Mulcair River.  The village is overlooked by the Slieve Felim Mountains and is approximately 20 minutes driving time from Limerick City. It has a rich agricultural hinterland in which the dairy industry is prominent.

The town has several pubs, grocery shops, a hardware store, GP surgery, pharmacy, bookmaker shop and veterinary clinic. Other services include a library and arts studios complex, a church, community centre and day care centre.  The village also has a fire brigade serving the surrounding area.

The town hosts an annual Agricultural Show in August each year.

Schools
There are three primary schools in Cappamore: Bilboa National School, Tineteriffe National School, and Scoil Chaitríona. St. Michael's Technical School was a secondary school that existed in the village up to 2013 when it amalgamated with the two second-level schools in Doon to create Scoil na Trionóide Naofa.

Transport
Cappamore is served by two Bus Éireann routes: the 332 to Limerick City via Newport which operates Monday to Saturday, and the 341 to Shannon via Murroe, Newport and Limerick City which operates Monday to Friday. 
 
Limerick Junction train station is located 20 kilometres from Cappamore and has Iarnród Éireann services to Dublin, Cork, Kerry and Waterford.  Limerick train station is 23 kilometres away with services to Dublin and Galway.

The nearest airport is Shannon, located 50 kilometres away with services to the UK, Europe and North America.

History
The famine years hit the area particularly badly, with the parish of Cappamore losing half of its population.  Cappamore Historical Society produced a major publication on the history of the area in 1992 entitled "Cappamore: A Parish History".

Sport
The sport of hurling is probably the most popular in Cappamore (see Cappamore GAA). Cappamore have won the Limerick Senior Hurling Championship on five occasions: 1904, 1954, 1956, 1958 and 1964. However Gaelic football, athletics (Bilboa AC) and soccer (Cappamore Celtic FC and Bilboa Ladies Soccer Team) have grown in recent years.

People

Notable people from Cappamore include:

 David Gleeson, Irish film director and writer.
 William O'Connor, professional darts player.
 Seamus Coffey, economist and chair of the Irish Fiscal Advisory Council
 John Hayes, international rugby player.
 Rosemary Ryan, Olympian.

See also
List of towns and villages in Ireland

References

Towns and villages in County Limerick
Parishes of the Roman Catholic Archdiocese of Cashel and Emly